Kyung-ja Chun (1924-August 6, 2015) was a prominent South Korean painter. She was born in 1924 in Goheung, South Jeolla Province, Chun studied painting at a college in Tokyo.

She was best known for her bold and vividly colorful paintings depicting mainly female figures, flowers, and animals. One of her most famous paintings, "Page 22 in My Sorrowful Legend" (1977) is a self-portrait with snakes on top of a woman's head.

References

External links 

 Official website

South Korean painters
1924 births
2015 deaths
Korean expatriates in Japan